Karl Franzevich Albrecht (27 August 1807 – 24 February 1863) was a German-Russian musician and composer.  He was born in Poznań.

Albrecht studied with Joseph Schnabel in Breslau and then worked from 1825 as a violinist in the theater in Breslau and as a conductor in Düsseldorf.  In 1838 he was appointed as conductor of the Opera and the Philharmonic in St. Petersburg.  Beginning in 1850 he was a singing teacher at the orphanage in Gatchina.  He died in Gatchina in 1863.

His son Konstantin Karlovich Albrecht (1836-1893) was a cellist and composer in Moscow.

From Karl Albrecht's compositions, a Mass, a ballet and three string quartets have survived.  There are other works by him that are listed as missing.

References
 Die Musik in Geschichte und Gegenwart, 1. Aufl., Bd. 15, S. 109 f.
 
 Paul Frank; Wilhelm Altmann: Kurzgefasstes Tonkünstler-Lexikon, Heinrichshofen´s Verlag Wilhelmshaven, 15. Auflage (1936) S. 7f

1807 births
1863 deaths
19th-century German musicians
19th-century German male musicians